Port Mercer is an unincorporated community located where the municipal boundaries of Lawrence Township, Princeton and West Windsor Township intersect in Mercer County, New Jersey, United States. It is the location of the historic Port Mercer Canal House along the Delaware and Raritan Canal.

Port mercer developed starting in the 1830s with the construction of the Delaware & Raritan Canal. It represents one of West Windsor's historic hamlets, and several mid-1800s residences still populate the community. The hamlet thrived from the 1830s until the mid-late 1800s, when the current Northeast Corridor rail line relocated from next to the canal to its current position.

In October 2019, the Historical Society of West Windsor published an online museum exploring the history of West Windsor - including Port Mercer.

References

External links 

 West Windsor History Museum - Port Mercer

 Port Mercer Canal House - Lawrence Historical Society

Lawrence Township, Mercer County, New Jersey
Princeton, New Jersey
West Windsor, New Jersey
Unincorporated communities in Mercer County, New Jersey
Unincorporated communities in New Jersey